The 1989–1992 Rugby League World Cup (sometimes shortened to 1992 Rugby League World Cup) was the tenth staging of the Rugby League World Cup, and continued to use the three-year format, stretching across the years 1989 to 1992. As with the 1985–1988 World Cup, teams played each other on a home-and-away basis. These matches were fitted into the normal international programme of three-match test series between the nations, with a pre-designated match from each series counting as the World Cup fixture. The tournament culminated in the 1992 Rugby League World Cup Final.

The matches went strictly to form, with Australia undefeated and certain to claim a world cup final berth as early as 1991. France and Papua New Guinea were uncompetitive, leading to a straight fight between New Zealand and Great Britain for the right to meet the Kangaroos in the final. In the event the Lions were able to just edge out the Kiwis on points difference.

As they had done in 1988, Australia had won the right to host the World Cup Final. However, with the potential for a much larger attendance, the Australian Rugby League agreed to allow Great Britain to host the game at the 82,000 capacity Wembley Stadium in London. The final was a surprisingly close affair, with Great Britain leading with only 12 minutes to go. The game's only try was then scored by centre Steve Renouf in his international debut for the Kangaroos and Australia were able to claim their fourth consecutive World Cup title before a world record international rugby league attendance of 73,631.

Venues

Final
The World Cup Final was played at Wembley Stadium in London.

Matches

Group stage

1989

The first match of the 1989–1992 World Cup was also the 3rd test of the 1989 Trans-Tasman Test series which was won 3–0 by Australia

1990

This match was also the 3rd and deciding test of the 1990 Ashes series.

1991

This match was also the 3rd and deciding test of the 1991 Trans-Tasman series.

Australian winger Willie Carne crossed for a hat trick of tries in Port Moresby.

1992

In addition to being an allocated World Cup match, this was the third, deciding test of the 1992 Ashes series. This six-point margin of defeat meant that New Zealand would need to beat Papua New Guinea by 109 points in the following match to prevent a Great Britain-Australia World Cup Final in October.

Final

This match set a new world record attendance for a rugby league international of 73,631, beating the previous record of 70,204 set at the Sydney Cricket Ground during the 1932 Ashes series. As they had done in 1988, Australia won the right to host the World Cup Final. However, in the interests of rugby league, and the potential for a much larger attendance since at the time Lang Park in Brisbane could only hold 33,000, and the Sydney Football Stadium could only seat 42,000, the ARL agreed to Great Britain hosting the final at the 82,000 capacity Wembley.

Unlike 1988 when Australia had agreed to let New Zealand host the Final at Eden Park in Auckland due to dwindling international attendances in Australia, the international game had become popular again over the next four years (mainly due to much improved performances by Great Britain and New Zealand) and there was a good chance of sell-out crowd in either Brisbane or Sydney for the game. However, the potential for an attendance at Wembley that would be almost or more than double the size that could be seen in Australia, and the potential exposure from playing the game at one of the world's most iconic stadiums, could not be ignored.

Both coaches picked experienced teams, with only Australian's Tim Brasher (fullback) and Steve Renouf (centre) making their international debut in the game. With incumbent fullback Andrew Ettingshausen unavailable through injury, Australian coach Bob Fulton preferred utility outside back Brasher over Newcastle Knights fullback Brad Godden due to Brasher's previous big game experience having played in Balmain's 1989 Grand Final loss as well as making his State of Origin debut earlier in the year. Fulton also chose seven members from the Brisbane Broncos 1992 Winfield Cup premiership winning team including exciting centre Renouf. Lions coach Mal Reilly chose to retain Garry Schofield as captain despite the presence of Ellery Hanley in the team. He also went with pace on the wings with Martin Offiah and St. Helens flyer Alan Hunte.

The hard-fought final was a one-try affair, with Great Britain leading 6–4 with only 12 minutes remaining. The only try of the match was then set up by Australian replacement back Kevin Walters, who, with a clever cut-out pass, put his Broncos teammate Steve Renouf into a gap not covered by replacement Lions centre John Devereux. Renouf, in his debut test for Australia, then raced 20 metres to score in the corner. Otherwise, the two teams' kickers (Mal Meninga and Deryck Fox) were called upon to score most of the points, including Meninga's pressure sideline conversion of Renouf's try. The rain started pouring in the second half and Australia was able to hold Great Britain out and maintain their lead until the final siren.

Australia's triumph saw them win their fourth World Cup in a row after winning the previous cups in 1975, 1977 and 1988. It also ended a mini-hoodoo for the Kangaroos at London's Wembley Stadium. Australia had previously left the arena 21–12 losers in 1973, and the 1990 Kangaroos were outplayed by Great Britain 19–12, but when it mattered most this time around Australia proved themselves as worthy World Cup champions.

The match was telecast live late at night throughout Australia on the Nine Network, with commentary provided by Ray Warren, Peter Sterling and Paul Vautin, with sideline comments from Chris Bombolas. The game broke Australia's midnight-to-dawn television ratings record which was set a year earlier by the rugby union's 1991 Rugby World Cup Final.

Try scorers
7

 Mal Meninga

5

 Willie Carne
 Brad Mackay
 Martin Offiah
 Garry Schofield
 Richie Blackmore
 Dave Watson

4

 Laurie Daley
 Andrew Ettingshausen

3

 Bradley Clyde
 Dale Shearer
 Tony Kemp

2

 Graham Mackay
 Mark McGaw
 Rod Wishart
 Jean-Marc Garcia
 Cyril Pons
 Denis Betts
 Paul Eastwood
 Shaun Edwards
 Carl Gibson
 Michael Jackson
 Paul Moriarty
 Andy Platt
 Daryl Powell
 Dean Clark
 Sam Panapa
 Kelly Shelford
 Stanley Haru
 Jack Uradok

1

 Greg Alexander
 Gary Belcher
 Ben Elias
 Brad Fittler
 Peter Jackson
 Chris Johns
 Michael O'Connor
 Steve Renouf
 Steve Roach
 Mark Sargent
 Steve Walters
 Christophe Auroy
 Denis Biénès
 Christophe Bonnafous
 Patrick Entat
 David Despin
 Daniel Divet
 Gilles Dumas
 David Fraisse
 Daniel Verdès
 Martin Dermott
 Paul Dixon
 Karl Fairbank
 Deryck Fox
 Bobbie Goulding
 Les Holliday
 Alan Hunte
 Paul Newlove
 Roy Powell
 Anthony Sullivan
 Alan Tait
 Dean Bell
 Mark Elia
 Gary Freeman
 Clayton Friend
 Gavin Hill
 Sean Hoppe
 Kevin Iro
 Mike Kuiti
 Dean Lonergan
 Duane Mann
 Jarrod McCracken
 Gary Mercer
 Tawera Nikau
 Matthew Ridge
 Brent Stuart
 Darrell Williams
 Sauna Babago
 Aquila Emil
 Paul Gela
 Chris Itam
 August Joseph
 James Naipo
 Gigmai Ongugo
 Opoe Soga
 Goie Waine

References

External links
1989–1992 World Cup at rlhalloffame.org.uk
1989–1992 World Cup at rlwc08.com
1989–1992 World Cup at rugbyleagueproject.com
1989–1992 World Cup data at hunterlink.net.au
1989–1992 World Cup at 188-rugby-league.co.uk